Netaji  is a Bengali biographical soap opera on the life of Netaji Subhash Chandra Bose that premiered on 14 January 2019 and aired on Bengali GEC Zee Bangla. Based majorly on Udyata Kharga Subhash by Achintya Kumar Sengupta and  produced by Surinder Films, the series stars  Abhishek Bose in the eponymous role, with Basabdatta Chatterjee, marking her comeback on television, Dhruvajyoti Sarkar, Kaushik Chakraborty, Sriparna Roy, Debopriyo Sarkar, Sohan Bandopadhyay, Fahim Mirza appearing in other recurring roles. Due to the COVID-19 pandemic, the shooting of the series was stalled. It was rumoured that along with Karunamoyee Rani Rashmoni, this series will be axed the channel. Putting rest to such rumours, the shooting started from June 11, maintaining all safety protocols and fresh episodes started to air from June 15, 2020. The series started to air on 11 PM from July 7, 2020, giving space for another series Kadambini to be aired in the 08:30 PM slot. The show went off air on 1 August 2020. The show is dubbed in Hindi and currently forecasted on And TV.

Plot
This show is a biographical drama, depicting the life of Netaji Subhash Chandra Bose. The show begins by presenting the youth of Netaji Subhas Chandra Bose, and presenting the many brave decisions Bose took as a young boy with his friends in Cuttack.

From episode 231 the series transitions to his later life, and his attendance at the Presidency College in Kolkata. In episode 390 there is another jump to 1933.

The show also presents other groups of independence involved at Bose's time, including the likes of Bagha Jatin, Sri Aurobindo, Khudiram Bose and many others associated with the Swadeshi movement . Often regarded as the greatest leader of the Indian Freedom Struggle, he fearlessly led his Indian National Army to war against the British, inspiring mass revolts and mutinies throughout the country, ultimately resulting in India's independence.

Cast
 Abhishek Bose as Netaji Subhas Chandra Bose
 Ankit Mazumder as young Subhas Chandra Bose
 Basabdatta Chatterjee as Prabhabati Bose
 Dhrubajyoti Sarkar as Sarat Chandra Bose
 Sriparna Roy as Bibhabati Bose
 Saugata Bandyopadhyay as Ashoke Nath Bose
 Diya Mukherjee as Sarbani Roy Choudhury (Bani)
 Rob Dey as Sisir Kumar Bose
 Ashmee Ghosh as Ila Bose
 Debopriyo Mukherjee as Mahatma Gandhi
 Debdut Ghosh as Rabindranath Tagore
 Sohan Bandopadhyay as Charles Tegart 
 Nilanjan Datta as Inspector Shiben Chowdhury 
 Shyamashis Pahari as Inspector Suresh Sarkhel 
 Neil Chatterjee as Pratap Babu 
 Fahim Mirza as Rash Behari Bose
 Debomoy Mukherjee as Hemanta Kumar Sarkar
 Siddhartha Shankar Chakraborty as Suresh Chandra Bose
 Jagriti Goswami as Arunprabha Bose
 Aditya Chowdhury as Sunil Chandra Bose
 Indranil Mullick as Rono Dutta
 Pritam Das as Charuchandra Gangopadhyay
 Supratim Sinha as Dilipkumar Roy
 Prriyam Chakraborty as Kalyani Das
 Sahana Sen as Basanti Devi
 Kunal Banerjee as Nanda.

Former cast
 Kaushik Chakraborty as Janakinath Bose  
 Debaparna Chakraborty as Anupama Dutta
 Sananda Basak as Pramilabala Mitra
 Ishani Sengupta as Saralabala Dey
 Subhrajit Dutta as Chittaranjan Das  
 Prantik Banerjee as Ananto Rai  
 Priyam as Sudhir Chandra Bose
 Ayush Das as young Sudhir Chandra Bose 
 Anirban Guha as Beni Madhab Das
 Swarnadipto Ghosh as Bagha Jatin  
 Swarnav Banerjee as Chittapriya Ray Chaudhuri 
 Rahul Sen as Manoranjan Sengupta  
 Biplab Dasgupta as Debendranath Bose
 Trilok Nath Thander as Nirendranath Dasgupta
 Arka Dasgupta as Charles Richardson 
 Bharat Kaul as Andrew Henderson Leith Fraser 
 Aritra Dutta as Hemchandra Kanungo
 Diganta Saha as Sushil Sen
 Diganta Das as Shyam Sundar Chakraborty
 Samiul Alam as Khudiram Bose
 Palash Debnath as the nationalist arrested from Lahore 
 Soumendra Bhattacharya as Prafulla Chaki  
 Tania Kar as Aparupa Roy
 Lakshya Punjabi as Kirpal Singh 
 Madhubani Goswami as Sarala Devi
 Indrajit Mazumder as Professor E.F. Oaten 
 Bhola Tamang as Kalochin
 Siddhartha Ghosh as Biren Dutta Gupta 
 Shaktipada Dey as DSP Shamsul Alam  
 Sayanjit Ghosh Dastidar as Ullaskar Dutta
 Chandan Sen as Dwijendralal Ray  
 Manoj Ojha as Sri Aurobindo
 Kanyakumari Mukherjee as Mrinalini Devi
 Ishani Das as Sarojini Devi
 Dwaipayan Das as Barin Ghosh
 Animesh Bhaduri as Bhupendranath Dutta

References

External links

 Netaji at ZEE5

Indian drama television series
Cultural depictions of Subhas Chandra Bose
Indian National Army in fiction
2019 Indian television series debuts
Television shows set in the British Raj
Indian historical television series
Indian independence movement fiction
Indian period television series
Zee Bangla original programming